Kangaroo? is the second collaboration between the experimental rock band The Red Crayola and the conceptual art group Art & Language, released in 1981 by Rough Trade Records. The album was adopted by Drag City and re-issued on CD in 1995.

Critical reception
The Rough Guide to Rock wrote that the album contained "quirky, ramshackle songs." The Spin Alternative Record Guide called it "interesting, but ... sort of brittle and too intellectual for its own good."

Track listing

Personnel 

Musicians
Ben Annesley – instruments
Epic Soundtracks – instruments, production
Gina Birch – instruments
Lora Logic – instruments, production
Allen Ravenstine – instruments
Mayo Thompson – instruments, production

Production
Adam Kidron – production
Tim Thompson – engineering, mixing

References

External links 
 

1981 albums
Drag City (record label) albums
Red Krayola albums
Albums produced by Adam Kidron
Albums produced by Mayo Thompson
Rough Trade Records albums